The 2011 Buffalo Funds - NAIA Division I men's basketball tournament was held in March at Municipal Auditorium in Kansas City, Missouri. The 74th annual NAIA basketball tournament featured 32 teams playing in a single-elimination format.

Awards and honors
Leading scorer: Brandon Brown
Leading rebounder: Ty Gough
Coach of the Year: Kelly Wells 
Player of the Year: Trevor Setty
Most consecutive tournament appearances: 20th, Georgetown (KY)
Most tournament appearances: Georgetown (Ky.), 30th of 30, appearances to the NAIA Tournament

2011 NAIA bracket

  * denotes overtime.

See also
2011 NAIA Division I women's basketball tournament
2011 NCAA Division I men's basketball tournament
2011 NCAA Division II men's basketball tournament
2011 NCAA Division III men's basketball tournament
2011 NAIA Division II men's basketball tournament

References

NAIA Men's Basketball Championship
Tournament
NAIA Division I men's basketball tournament
NAIA Division I men's basketball tournament